A Virgin and a Whore is the fourth album by Finnish symphonic death metal band Eternal Tears of Sorrow. It was their last album before the band's hiatus between 2001 and 2004. This is the last EToS album to feature keyboardist Pasi Hiltula (who had been in the band since early 1999) and the only album to feature guitarist Antti Kokko.

The seventh song on the album, "Sick, Dirty and Mean" is a cover song, originally written and performed by Accept. The band had rehearsed the song for a two-part tribute album (Tribute to Accept Vol. 1 & 2) in 1999 but didn't have any extra time to record it. So, they decided to include the song on A Virgin and a Whore.

The album's cover art was made by Niklas Sundin of Cabin Fever Media and guitarist of Dark Tranquillity.

Track listing 

Japanese edition bonus tracks:
 "As I Die" (Paradise Lost cover) – 4:03
 "The River Flows Frozen" (Acoustic Version) – 5:47

Credits

Band members 
 Altti Veteläinen – vocals, bass
 Jarmo Puolakanaho – guitar
 Antti Kokko – lead guitar
 Pasi Hiltula – keyboards
 Petri Sankala – drums

Guest appearances 
 Juha Kylmänen – clean vocals (on tracks 5, 6 and 11)

References 

2001 albums
Eternal Tears of Sorrow albums